The 2016–17 Japan Figure Skating Championships were held on December 22ー25, 2016 at the RACTAB Namihaya Dome in Kadoma, Osaka. It was the 85th edition of the event. Medals were awarded in the disciplines of men's singles, ladies' singles, pair skating, and ice dancing.

Results

Men
Hanyu withdrew due to influenza two days before the competition.

Ladies
Miyahara won the national title for the third year in a row.

Pairs

Ice dancing

Japan Junior Figure Skating Championships
The 2016–17 Junior Championships took place on November 18–20, 2016 at the Tsukisamu Gymnasium in Sapporo, Hokkaido. Medals were awarded in the men's singles, ladies' singles, and ice dancing. The junior pairs competition was held during the senior Championships the following month.

Men

Ladies

Pairs

Ice dancing

International team selections

The Japan Skating Federation selected skaters for international competitions in the second half of the 2016–17 season based on the results of the National Championships, as well as international ISU-sanctioned competitions. It published its list of entries on December 27, 2016.

World Championships
The 2017 World Championships will be held from March 29 to April 2, 2017 in Helsinki, Finland. The event will also determine the number of spots per discipline that countries will earn for the 2018 Winter Olympics in Pyeongchang, South Korea.

Four Continents Championships
The 2017 Four Continents Championships will be held on February 14–19, 2017 in Gangneung, South Korea.

World Junior Championships
The 2017 World Junior Figure Skating Championships will take place on March 14–19, 2017 in Taipei.

Asian Winter Games
The 2017 Asian Winter Games will be held on February 19–26, 2017 in Sapporo and Obihiro, Hokkaido, Japan. Within the Winter Games period, figure skating events will take place on February 23-26, 2017 at the Makomanai Ice Arena in Sapporo.

References

External links
 Japan Skating Federation official results & data

Japan Figure Skating Championships
Japan Championships
Figure Skating Championships